Overseas Warriors is a franchise cricket team that represents the Kashmiri diaspora in the Kashmir Premier League. They were coached by Mushtaq Ahmed and captained by Imad Wasim.

Squad

Season standings

Points table

League fixtures and results

Playoffs

Eliminator 1

Statistics

Most runs 

Source: Score360

Most wickets 

Source: Score 360

References

External links
 Team Records 2021 at ESPNcricinfo

Cricket teams